Mineral rights are property rights to exploit an area for the minerals it harbors. Mineral rights can be separate from property ownership (see Split estate).  Mineral rights can refer to sedentary minerals that do not move below the Earth's surface or fluid minerals such as oil or natural gas.  There are three major types of mineral property; unified estate, severed or split estate, and fractional ownership of minerals.

Mineral estate 
Owning mineral rights (often referred to as a "mineral interest" or a "mineral estate") gives the owner the right to exploit, mine, and/or produce any or all minerals they own. Minerals can refer to oil, gas, coal, metal ores, stones, sands, or salts. An owner of mineral rights may sell, lease, or donate those minerals to any person or company as they see fit. Mineral interests can be owned by private landowners, private companies, or federal, state or local governments.  Sorting these rights are a large part of mineral exploration.  A brief outline of rights and responsibilities of parties involved can be found here.

Types of mineral estate

Unified estate 
Unified estates, sometimes referred to as "fee simple" or "unified tenure" mean that the surface and mineral rights are not severed.

Severed/split estate 
This type of estate occurs when mineral and surface ownership are separated.  This can occur from prior ownership of mineral rights or is commonly performed when land is passed between family generations.  Today corporations own a significant portion of mineral rights beneath private individuals.

Fractional ownership 
Here a percentage of the mineral property is owned by two or more entities.  This can occur when owners leave fractions of the rights to multiple children or grandchildren.

Severed/split estate 
Mineral estates can be severed, or separated, from surface estates. There are two main avenues to mineral rights severance: the surface property may be sold and the minerals retained, or the minerals may be sold and the surface property retained, though the former is more common. When mineral rights have been severed from the surface rights (or property rights), it is referred to as a "split estate." In a split estate, the owner of the mineral rights has the right to develop those minerals, regardless of who owns the surface rights.  This is because in United States law, mineral rights trump surface rights.  The U.S. historical precedent for this severance roots from western expansion and The Land Ordinance Act of 1785 and The Northwest Ordinance Act of 1789 at the cost of dispossessed Natives. Severability was further reinforced by the Homestead Act of 1862 (OHA) and the 1862 Railroad Act.  Agricultural patents and the California gold rush of 1848 began placing lands that were mineral abundant into private hands and furthered the precedent of mineral rights outweighing surface rights. This was a crucial step in the development of an economic system based largely on private incentives and market transactions. An early case involving a property dispute between a father and son involving ownership of coal veins in Pennsylvania is cited stating; “One who has the exclusive right to mine coal upon a tract of land has the right of possession even as against the owner of the soil, so far as it is necessary to carry on mining operations.” (Turner v. Reynolds, 1854).  A later case in Texas in 1862 set precedent by stating “it is a well-established doctrine from the earliest days of the common law, that the right to the minerals thus reserved carries with it the right to enter, dig and carry them away." (Cowan v. Hardeman, 1862).  Some may argue that the U.S. justice system's enabling of this precedent is further exacerbated by industry lobbying that enables the status quo of favoring oil and gas development vs other innovations.

This severability can create tension between mineral rights owners and surface rights owners if the surface rights owners do not want to allow the mineral rights owners to use their property to access their minerals.  This is becoming ever more present in the light of recent unconventional oil and gas development (UOGD) made feasible by technological advancement such as hydraulic fracturing.   Problems include water pollution, fluid storage issues and surface damages.  These are especially common in the West Virginia gas wells of the Marcellus Shale. Often, companies will offer a surface rights owner a surface use agreement, which can provide financial compensation to the surface owner, or more commonly, offer some concessions on how the minerals are accessed. For example, some surface use agreements require the company to access the property from specific roads or points on the property.

A major issue involving fluid mineral rights is the "rule of capture" whereby minerals capable of migrating beneath the Earth's surface can be extracted, even if the original source was another person's mineral property.  Such claims typically are protected by various states' oil and gas regulatory agencies whose broader mandate is to promote conservation and minimize conflicts between mineral owners.

Major elements 
The five elements of a mineral right are:
 The right to use as much of the surface as is reasonably necessary to access the minerals
 The right to further convey rights
 The right to receive bonus consideration
 The right to receive delay rentals
 The right to receive royalties

The owner of a mineral interest may separately convey any or all of the above-listed interests. Minerals may be possessed as a life estate, which does not permit a person to sell them, but merely that they own the minerals so long as they live.  After this, the rights revert to a predesignated entity, such as a specific organization or person.

It is possible for a mineral right owner to sever and sell an oil and gas royalty interest, while keeping the other mineral rights. In such case, if the oil lease expires, the royalty interest is extinguished, its purchaser has nothing, and the mineral owner still owns the minerals.

Mineral rights leasing 
An owner of mineral rights may choose to lease those mineral rights to a company for development at any point. Signing a lease signals that both parties agree to the terms laid out in the lease. Lease terms typically include a price to be paid to the mineral rights owner for the minerals to be extracted, and a set of circumstances under which those minerals are to be extracted. For instance, a mineral rights owner might request that the company minimize any noise and light pollution when extracting the minerals. Leases are usually term-limited, meaning the company has a limited amount of time to develop the resources; if they do not begin development within that time-frame they forfeit their right to extract those minerals.

The four components of mineral rights leasing are:
 Ownership
 Leasing
 The Division Order
 The Royalty Check

Ownership 
There are three distinct but related aspects of ownership. They are:

 Legal description
 Net mineral acres
 Ownership type

Ownership Types

Leasing 
To bring oil and gas reserves to market, minerals are conveyed for a specified time to oil companies through a legally binding contract known as a lease. This arrangement between individual mineral owners and oil companies began prior to 1900 and still thrives today. Before exploration can begin, the mineral owner (lessor) and the oil company (lessee) must agree to certain terms regarding the rights, privileges and obligations of the respective parties during the exploration and possible production stages.

Although there are numerous other important details, the basic structure of the lease is straightforward: in exchange for an up-front lease bonus payment, plus a royalty percentage of the value of any production, the mineral owner grants the oil company the right to drill for a period of time, known as the primary term. If the term of the oil or gas lease extends beyond the primary term, and a well was not drilled, then the Lessee is required to pay the lessor a delay rental. This delay rental could be $1 or more per acre. In some cases, no drilling occurs and the lease simply expires.

The duration of the lease may be extended when drilling or production starts. This enters into the period of time known as the secondary term, which applies for as long as oil and gas is produced in paying quantities.

The division order 
A division order is not a contract. It is a stipulation, derived from the lease agreement and other agreements, as to what the Operator of a well or an oil and/or gas purchaser will disburse in terms of revenue to the mineral owner and others. The purpose of the division order is to show how the mineral revenues are divided up between the oil company, the owners of the mineral rights (royalty owners) and the overriding royalty interest owners.
The Division Order needs a signature, a current address and social security number for individual royalty owners or tax identification number for companies.

Oil and gas lease
An oil and gas lease is a contract because it contains consideration, consent, legal tangible items and competency.
The term of the lease. Usually there is a primary term and a secondary term. Each term has conditions set up either by the lessor or lessee to fulfill. 
The royalty rate. This is how the rates are divided and how it is calculated from the revenues produced from the mineral rights. 
If the lessor receives a bonus
If there is a delay rental agreement—any delay in production by the lessee for a negotiated period, the lessee can pay the lessor a negotiated amount of money per year to keep the contract active
If there is a "shut-in royalty" agreement—royalties are paid at a negotiated rate per acre, only while the well is not producing oil or gas

Many other line items can be negotiated by the time the contract is complete. The rights of all parties are defined in agreements; and, when mineral production begins, the division order states how much revenue goes to each party involved.

Royalty check 

Mineral owners may receive a monthly royalty check if oil, gas, or any other substances of value are extracted from below the surface and either sold or used by an oil and gas operating company. Royalty statements include the production and revenue figures for both the individual owner and the entire well. The royalty paid is a function of the net value of the proceeds from the sale of the oil, gas, or other substance, multiplied by the owner's revenue interest decimal, less any amounts deducted for taxes or other deductions.

The revenue decimal used to calculate the amount of an owner's royalty check is calculated with the following equation:
 A = Net Mineral Acres owned
 U = Number of Mineral Acres in the oil and gas drilling unit or pool
 R = The Royalty assigned to the mineral right owner by the oil and gas lease covering his or her minerals
 P = Participation Factor assigned to the tracts owned by the mineral owner as described in a unit agreement
 Y = Additional Ownership Factor assigned to the owner's mineral rights by any other arrangement or agreement
 D = Deductions

Revenue interest decimal 

It is common for royalty checks to fluctuate between pay periods due to monthly changes in oil or gas prices, or changes in the volumes produced by the associated oil or gas wells.  Additionally, royalties may cease altogether if the associated wells quit producing marketable quantities of oil or gas, if the operating company has changed hands and the new operator has not yet established a new payment account for the owner, or if the operating company or product purchaser is missing appropriate paperwork or proper documentation of changes in ownership or contact information.

Surface use agreement
A surface use agreement (SUA) is a contract between a property owner and a mineral rights holder that dictates how the mineral rights are to be developed. Meaning, when mineral rights are extracted by a company that does not own the property above where the minerals are located, the company has the legal right to extract those minerals regardless. However, companies will often enter into voluntary negotiations with the surface rights owner to ensure that the operations all go smoothly. In such cases, the company will offer a SUA, in which property owners may ask for financial compensation or other concessions regarding how the minerals are extracted. See sample.

See also
 Air rights
 Bergregal - mining rights in Europe
 Easement
 General Mining Act of 1872
 Land rights
 Oil and gas law in the United States
 Split estate
 Stock-Raising Homestead Act of 1916
 Water rights

References

External links

 How to File a US Federal Mining Claim
 'War Brewing' over Mining Rights in Rural BC, TheTyee.ca, June 14, 2006
 Surface Rights vs. Mineral Rights
 What Is A Mining Claim, Legally?

Real property law
Mining law and governance
Oil and gas law